Last Call is an American late-night talk show that aired in syndication from 1994 to 1995.

Format
Created by Brandon Tartikoff, the show was set in a loft that disguised the true time at which it was taped, allowing the late night viewer to assume they were watching a live broadcast.  The show had four hosts that bantered with each other over different topics in the news, and featured topical guests and musical guests.  Musical acts tended to be of the alternative music genre, such as the band Scarce.

Hosts
The different hosts included Tad Low, critic Elvis Mitchell, magazine editor Terry McDonell, actress/writer Brianne Leary, and London Sunday Times correspondent Sue Ellicott.

Reception
The show was not well received, with Entertainment Weekly's reviewer calling it "a younger, hipper McLaughlin Group" with hosts who "giggle, gabble, and groan."

References

External links
 

1990s American late-night television series
1994 American television series debuts
1995 American television series endings
First-run syndicated television programs in the United States
Television series by Universal Television